Mikhail Sachkovskiy (born 21 November 2002) is a Belarusian professional footballer who plays for Slutsk.

References

External links 
 
 

2002 births
Living people
Sportspeople from Pinsk
Belarusian footballers
Association football midfielders
FC Slutsk players